The Telltale Lilac Bush and Other West Virginia Ghost Tales is a collection of 100 folklore and ghost stories compiled by Ruth Ann Musick.

The tales surround ghost stories from around the Marion County area in northern West Virginia.  A sequel volume, entitled Coffin Hollow and Other Ghost Tales, is also available and adds another 96 stories to the collection.

The original book was published in 1965 as a hard bound book, while subsequent printings were paperback.  The paperback version is still in print and widely available throughout Appalachia today. There are a variety of stories in it.  

There is a web series featuring stories from the books on YouTube.  The series, produced with permission from the books' publisher University Press of Kentucky, ran for four seasons and 80 webisodes between October 2011 and May 2015.

1965 short story collections
West Virginia folklore
Marion County, West Virginia
American short story collections
Fantasy short story collections